Bafra is a district of Samsun Province of Turkey. The Bafra Plain is famous in Turkey for its rich soil and high quality tobacco growing conditions. The city is well known in Turkey for its ice cream, cigarettes, tobacco and agricultural produce. In 2020, the district reported a population of 143,366. The city is located 52 km northwest of Samsun and is connected by State road D.010.

History

The name of the municipality is thought to have come from the Phoenician name "bafira" or "bavra". Other beliefs about the etymology of the region come from the name "Ba-Hura" (Great River) given to Kizilirmak which generates the delta upon which the city is located. Historical records of human settlement in Bafra and the Kizilirmak delta date to as early as 5000 BC. Researchers working at the nearby İkiztepe ruins have found traces of human settlement belonging to the Chalcolithic period (5000-4000 BC). It has been determined that a continuous human settlement existed in the İkiztepe ruins between 4000 BC and 1700 BC. Additional evidence of settlement is found to have existed during the Bronze Age (3000-2000 BC) and Early Hittite (1900-1800 BC) period. Researchers found that an early capital existed in Hattusa, Anatolia and later moved to the Kizilirmak Valley. The region was known as Paphlagonia as of 670 BC. 6th century BC, Persians invaded the region in 546 BC and captured it from the Lydians. Graves from the Hellenistic period (330-30 BC) exist at İkiztepe.

The region came under the rule of the Rome who renamed the area Gadilon and later Helega. After the Fall of the Western Roman Empire, the area became part of the Byzantine Empire. The region was a part of the Byzantine Empire until the Battle of Manzikert in 1071. After that battle, Bafra was captured by the Anatolian Seljuk Ruler Kaykaus I. After being conquered by the Seljuk Empire the region was repopulated by members of various Turkmen tribes. The invasion of the Mongol Empire began in 1243 and led to the collapse of Seljuk Empire and the establishment of scattered Turkish principalities. During this period, the Bafra Principality was briefly established. This political arrangement continued until 1460, when Bafra was again conquered and made part of the Ottoman Empire.

Under the Ottoman Empire, the town of Bafra was incorporated into Trabzon Province under the leadership of Canik Sanjak. The region flourished as an agricultural, fishing and shipping center under the Ottoman Empire. The exact date of the establishment of the modern town is not known, though according to historical census records it appears in 1854. Many Turks came to Bafra from the Crimean Khanate after the loss of Crimea to the Russian Empire in 1783. These refugees largely settled in Bafra due to its location on the Black Sea. According to the Ottoman census of 1893, the population of Bafra was 62,782. The vast majority of those living in the region at the time of that census (62% (38,936 people)) were Sunni Muslim Turks. The Greek population of Bafra 22,834 (36%). As a result of the 1923 partition, the Greek population left the region entirely and was replaced by Greek Muslims most of whom came from Western Thrace. Fortunes for the Ottoman Empire declined further as a result of the Balkan and First World Wars during which the region became significantly impoverished. The decline in economic conditions lead to growing tensions between the largely impoverish ethnic Turkish Sunni Muslim population and the wealthier Greek and Armenian Christian populations. In the events preceding the Turkish War of Independence, the Greek population of the region founded the Mavri Mira Society and considered the establishment of a Pontic governate to fortify their interests. However, with the start of the National Struggle in 1919, these aims could not be realized and armed conflicted ensued. The Pontic Greek population left the region after the partition of 1923 which caused widespread economic devastation.

Refugees from the former Ottoman Empire were settled in Bafra and in villages along the Kızılırmak river in an attempt to repopulate the region and revive its agricultural economy. With the repopulation of the region, Bafra entered into a period of extensive agricultural, cultural and economic development. Between 1950 and 1951, a small number of Turks from the Deliorman region of Bulgaria resettled in Bafra. in the years 1950-1951. Due to Bafra's appealing growing climate and tobacco industry, many people from the Eastern Black Sea, Tokat, Sivas and various provinces of Anatolia settled in the district. Bafra has a small population of Pomak people. Some of Pomak people continue to live in a traditional manner in the rural portions of Bafta. After the First Balkan War, a large population of Albanian immigrants from Kosovo settled around Bafra. Albanian has been forgotten by most Albanians, it is spoken only in villages among the elderly. In recent decades Bafra became a region defined by out-migration of the local population, political dysfunction and a decades long economic malaise caused by the decline of the tobacco industry and deindustrialization.

Geography
Bafra is located in the western portion of Samsun Province. The city is 52 km northwest of Samsun City Center and neighboring Atakum. The town directly to the east of Bafra is Ondokuzmayıs, the northern edge of the city is bounded by the Black Sea, to the west is Alçam and to the south Kavak, Havza and Vezirköprü. Its area is 175,000 hectares of which most is devoted to agricultural uses.

Bafra sits in the Bafra Plain which is set in the Kızılırmak delta. To the south of the city are the Küre Mountains. The highest of these nearby mountains is Mount Nebiyan with an elevation of 1224 m. The Küre Mountains mountains are the extensions of the Canik Mountains. The Kızılırmak River is Bafra's largest and Turkey's longest river. The river reaches the plain by crossing these mountains through a deep valley. The Bafra Plain was formed entirely by the sediment from the Kızılırmak River. The length of Kızılırmak is 1151 km. It river originates from Kızıl Mountain in Sivas and draws a wide arc through Central Anatolia before meeting the Black Sea north of Bafra. The rainy season in the region is between April and July during which floods are a common occurrence.

Climate
The prevailing winds in the district differ according to the season. In summer, a local high pressure center occurs in the Black Sea Region and a local low pressure center occurs in Anatolia. This causes the winds flowing from the Black Sea to collide, often causing storms and heavy rains. In winter, Bafra primarily gets dry and hot winds blowing from the southwest and south which reduce humidity and lead to temperate conditions. Bafra is a relatively humid region with an average annual metric of 73%. This figure is higher in late Spring and early Summer and lower in Winter. Bafra's rainiest season is November and its driest is May. Bafra gets an average of 700 mm of rain annually and records an average 100 rainy days a year.

Politics
Bafra is historically a very religiously and politically conservative region. The mayor of Bafra is Hamit Kiliç from the Justice and Development Party (AKP). The governor of Samsun Province is Mustafa Demir who is also a member of the AKP. Bafra is considered a stronghold of the party and consistently supports the candidacy of Recep Tayyip Erdoğan for Prime Minister and President. In 2018, 51.8% of voters in Bafra cast ballots for the AKP. This figure declined however from a peak performance in 2015 when 61.9% of residents voted for the AKP.

Economy
Bafra's economy has historically been driven by the growth and export of tobacco. The region's tobacco is known to be very low nicotine, small, red, light red colored, fine-grained, fine-grained, elastic, high-smoked, sweet, and aromatic. Foreign cigarette manufacturers were said to desire the tobacco grown on the Bafra Plain in order to improve the quality of their products. Bafra tobacco was long sought as the highest quality of natural tobacco in the world. Due to a variety of factors including agricultural mismanagement, reduced demand, logistical challenges and innovation in tobacco growth elsewhere in the world has led to a decline in tobacco exports from Bafra. This has had a significant adverse effect on the local population and contributed to persistently high unemployment and out-migration among working age people in the region. This crisis was further exacerbated by the Turkish government's shutdown of TEKEL. Today tobacco production in the region is negligible with most former farms now growing other products.

Cuisine
İçli Pide: is Bafra's most famous dish. Colloquially known as Pide, this is a popular and savory dish known for its origins in and around Samsun.
Nokul: is a type of puff pastry. Nokul is a type of pastry eaten in Turkey and Bulgaria with variations. Nokul is sometimes served hot as an appetizer instead of bread. It consists of a rolled sheet of yeast dough onto which feta-style white cheese, walnut or poppy seed is sprinkled over a thin coat of butter. The dough is then rolled, cut into individual portions, and baked.
Turkish delight with Cream: Residents of Bafra use a special cream made from buffalo milk. This is only available during certain months of the year. 
Dondurma: A special type of sticky, yellow vanilla ice cream is produced in Bafra and is regionally popular. The ice cream is pounded and produced in a fashion that takes several hours.

Festivals
Karadede Fair: A fair with over 100 years of history that was established in Gökçeağaç Village. The festival is held annually in Bafra on the last Sunday of August. Thousands of people attend the fair enjoying concerts, various events and shows. The fair has a wide array of stands and food vendors.
Bafra Watermelon Festival: An annual celebration is held in Bafra to celebrate the welcoming of watermelon to Turkey. The festival includes concerts, folklore performances, exhibitions and conferences about watermelon. The festival ceased operation in 2014. 
Sele-Sepet top Kandil: A festival held on the 15th night of Ramadan month.
Kapikaya Festival: Nature and Sports Festival: A festival that lasts for 5 days on the Kapikaya Hill to the south of Bafra. The festival offers the opportunity to do various outdoor sports and aims to bring together national and international athletes over a shared love of nature.

Weaving and crafts
Regional crafts such as carpet and rug knitting have continued to hold an important place in the life of residents of Bafra. Rug weaving, wicker and zembell knitting and other handicrafts made by residents play a part in the region's economy and touristic appeal.

References

 
Populated places in Samsun Province